Levobetaxolol is a drug used to lower the pressure in the eye in treating conditions such as glaucoma.  It is marketed as a 0.25 or 0.5% ophthalmic solution of levobetaxolol hydrochloride under the trade name Betaxon.  Levobetaxolol is a beta-adrenergic receptor inhibitor (beta blocker).

Indications 
It is indicated for intraocular pressure reduction in patients with open-angle glaucoma or ocular hypertension.

Effect
Levobetaxolol inhibits the beta-1-adrenergic receptor. When applied topically, it reduces intra-ocular pressure (IOP) by 16-23% depending on time of day and the individual. It also has neuroprotective effects. Levobetaxolol has fewer cardiovascular side effects than other beta blockers.

Contraindications and side effects
Levobetaxolol should not be used by people who have sinus bradycardia, atrioventricular block, cardiogenic shock, or overt cardiac failure. The drug has been associated with bradycardia and hypertension.

History
Levobetaxolol was developed in the 1980s. It was FDA approved in 2000.

References 

Beta blockers
N-isopropyl-phenoxypropanolamines
Enantiopure drugs
Isopropylamino compounds
Cyclopropanes